The 1910 Ilkeston by-election was a Parliamentary by-election in the constituency of Ilkeston in Derbyshire. It returned one Member of Parliament (MP) to the House of Commons of the United Kingdom, elected by the first past the post voting system. The by-election was held on 7 March 1910.

Vacancy
The by-election was held due to the  incumbent Liberal MP, Walter Foster, becoming Baron Ilkeston and taking a seat in the House of Lords. Foster had been Liberal MP for the seat of Ilkeston since the 1887 Ilkeston by-election.

Electoral history
The seat had been Liberal since it was created in 1885. They easily held the seat at the last election, with a reduced majority;

Candidates
The local Liberal Association selected 42-year-old Rt Hon. Jack Seely to defend the seat.

Campaign
Polling Day was fixed for the 7 March 1910.

Result
The Liberals held the seat and managed a slightly reduced majority;

Aftermath

References

1910 elections in the United Kingdom
1910 in England
1910s in Derbyshire
By-elections to the Parliament of the United Kingdom in Derbyshire constituencies
Ilkeston